Ali M'Madi (born 21 April 1990) is a professional footballer who plays for Championnat National 2 club SAS Épinal. He plays as either a forward or a winger. Born in France, he plays for the Comoros national team.

Club career
M'Madi was born in Marseille. He had stints in the youth academies of both Cannes and Lens before joining Evian in 2009.

International career 
Although born in France, he plays for the Comoros at senior international level and made his international debut on 9 October 2010 in a 2012 Africa Cup of Nations qualification against Mozambique.

References

External links 
 
 
 
 

Living people
1990 births
French sportspeople of Comorian descent
Citizens of Comoros through descent
French footballers
Footballers from Marseille
Comorian footballers
Association football wingers
Association football forwards
Comoros international footballers
2021 Africa Cup of Nations players
Thonon Evian Grand Genève F.C. players
Gazélec Ajaccio players
Grenoble Foot 38 players
FC Villefranche Beaujolais players
Andrézieux-Bouthéon FC players
Ligue 1 players
Ligue 2 players
Championnat National players
Championnat National 2 players
Championnat National 3 players
Expatriate footballers in France